State Road 210 (SR 210), locally known as Moncrief Road, is a state highway in the Northside of Jacksonville, within the northeastern part of the U.S. state of Florida. It travels approximately  extending diagonally from its northwestern terminus at Old Kings Road to its southeastern terminus at West 13th Street.

Route description 
SR 210 is a four-lane street for most of its length. It begins at Old Kings Road, (near I-295), followed by New Kings Road (US 1 / US 23 / SR 15), and Soutel Drive (SR 115A). Then it travels through several neighborhoods, meeting roads like Avenue B, and intersects with Edgewood Avenue W (SR 111), followed by West 45th Street. Passing the CSX railroad tracks, it intersects Golfair Boulevard, which head towards to I-95, West 33rd Street, West 26th Street, Myrtle Avenue N, then intersects with Martin Luther King Jr. Parkway (US 1 / SR 15) before it ends at West 13th Street near I-95.

Major intersections

See also

 
 
 Transportation in Jacksonville, Florida

210
210
210